James Ernest Oakley (10 November 1901 – 1972) was an English professional footballer who played as a full-back for Sunderland.

References

1901 births
1972 deaths
Sportspeople from Tynemouth
Footballers from Tyne and Wear
English footballers
Association football fullbacks
Seaton Delaval F.C. players
Blyth Spartans A.F.C. players
Sunderland A.F.C. players
Reading F.C. players
Northampton Town F.C. players
Kettering Town F.C. players
Birtley F.C. players
English Football League players